Pachysphinx peninsularis is a species of moth of the  family Sphingidae. It is known from Mexico.

References

Smerinthini
Moths described in 1963